The 2000–01 season saw Peterborough United compete in the Football League Second Division where they finished in 12th position with 59 points.

Final league table

Results
Peterborough United's score comes first

Legend

Football League Second Division

FA Cup

Football League Cup

Peterborough United eliminated on away goal rule

Football League Trophy

Squad statistics

References

External links
 Peterborough United 2000–01 at Soccerbase.com (select relevant season from dropdown list)

Peterborough United F.C. seasons
Peterborough United